Australian soccer clubs have entered Asian and Oceania competitions (AFC Champions League, OFC Champions League and the now defunct Oceania Cup Winners' Cup) since 1987 where Adelaide City entered the competition as the Australian representative. Since 2007, Australian clubs have participated in this league. For their first five competitions, the A-League was given two spots in the league- one for the champions (grand final winners) and one for the premiers (regular season winners- or the losing grand finalist if the champions and premiers were the same team). For the 2012 competition, another half a spot was added, with the highest placed team on the A-League table which has not already qualified for the AFC Champions League entering a playoff to enter the competition.

The Western Sydney Wanderers are the only Australian side to win the competition, while Adelaide United are the only Australian side to have made the final and lost.

For the 2013 competition the AFC reduced the number of A-League qualification spots to 1.5. The Premiers (regular season winners) directly qualified for the Asian Champions League. The Champions (winners of grand final) entered a play off to qualify for the competition. The AFC ruled that the A-League did not meet the criteria for full participation in the tournament, including the lack of promotion and relegation within a tiered league system was a major reason, and that the A-league was not run as a separate entity to the FFA.

From the 2014 AFC Champions League until the 2016 edition, the allocation of two spots in the group stage and one qualifying play-off spot returned and in 2017, the qualifying play-off spot dropped back to a place in the Preliminary Round 2.

From the 2023–24 AFC Champions League season, Australian clubs will be allocated one spot in the group stage, and two spots in the 2023–24 AFC Cup group stage. 

Australian soccer clubs have entered Asian and Oceania competitions (AFC Champions League, OFC Champions League and the now defunct Oceania Cup Winners' Cup). Australian clubs have also taken part in the FIFA Club World Cup and the Pan-Pacific Championship which however, were not won by any Australian club.

Who qualifies for AFC competitions

Winners of Asian, Oceania and worldwide competitions from Australia

Asian, Oceania and world competition winners

Full Australian record for Australian soccer clubs

AFC Champions League

Australian teams have won the competition 1 time and been in the final on 2 occasions as of 1 November 2014.

OFC Champions League
Australian teams have won the competition 4 times and been in the final on 4 occasions as of 10 June 2005.

Oceania Cup Winners' Cup

Performance summary by competition

Performance record and ranking of A-League clubs in AFC Champions League
GS: Group Stage, R16: Round of 16, QF: Quarter-Finals, SF: Semi-Finals, RU: Runners-Up, W: Winners,

FIFA Club World Cup

Pan-Pacific Championship

See also 
 Chinese clubs in the AFC Champions League
 Indian football clubs in Asian competitions
 Indonesian football clubs in Asian competitions
 Iranian clubs in the AFC Champions League
 Iraqi clubs in the AFC Champions League
 Japanese clubs in the AFC Champions League
 Myanmar clubs in the AFC Champions League
 Qatari clubs in the AFC Champions League
 Saudi Arabian clubs in the AFC Champions League
 South Korean football clubs in Asian competitions
 Thai clubs in the AFC Champions League
 Vietnamese clubs in the AFC Champions League

References

External links
 AFC Champions League official website
 AFC Champions League on RSSSF

A-League Men records and statistics
Australian soccer clubs in international competitions
Soccer in Australia